Alfred Alexander Thompson (28 April 1891 – 19 April 1969) was an English professional footballer who played in the Football League for Glossop and Brentford as an inside forward.

Career 
An inside forward, Thompson began his career in the Football League as a youth with Liverpool, before joining with Glossop. He moved to Woolwich Arsenal, where he failed to make a first team appearance and instead spent his time with the club in the reserves. Thompson later dropped into non-League football and had a spell with Birmingham & District League club Walsall. After the First World War, Thompson signed for Southern League First Division club Brentford. He scored eight goals in 28 appearances during the 1919–20 season and earned another shot at league football, with Brentford being elected into the new Third Division for the 1920–21 season. He managed 16 appearances and two goals and was released at the end of the season. Thompson dropped into non-league football and linked up with former Brentford teammate Jimmy Hodson at Southern League South Division club Guildford United. He later played for Tunbridge Wells Rangers.

Personal life 
Thompson served as a gunner in the Royal Garrison Artillery during the First World War.

Career statistics

References

1891 births
1969 deaths
Footballers from Manchester
English footballers
Association football inside forwards
Liverpool F.C. players
Glossop North End A.F.C. players
Arsenal F.C. players
Walsall F.C. players
Brentford F.C. players
Guildford City F.C. players
Tunbridge Wells F.C. players
English Football League players
Southern Football League players
British Army personnel of World War I
Royal Garrison Artillery soldiers
Military personnel from Manchester